The Liechtenstein Billie Jean King Cup team represents Liechtenstein in the Billie Jean King Cup tennis competition and are governed by the Liechtensteiner Tennisverband.  They have not competed since 2016.

History
Liechtenstein competed in its first Fed Cup in 1996. Their best result came in 2014, when they defeated Bosnia and Herzegovina in their Group II promotional play-off, resulting in Liechtenstein's accession to Group I for the first time in history.

See also
Fed Cup
Liechtenstein Davis Cup team

External links

Billie Jean King Cup teams
Fed Cup
Fed Cup